Wells in Flames (French: Puits en flammes) is a 1937 German adventure film directed by Viktor Tourjansky and starring Josseline Gaël, George Rigaud and Suzy Vernon. It is the French-language version of City of Anatol (1936).

The film's sets were designed by the art director Otto Hunte.

Cast

References

Bibliography 
 Rentschler, Eric. The Ministry of Illusion: Nazi Cinema and Its Afterlife. Harvard University Press, 1996.

External links 
 

1937 films
1937 adventure films
German adventure films
Films of Nazi Germany
1930s French-language films
Films directed by Victor Tourjansky
UFA GmbH films
German multilingual films
German black-and-white films
Films based on German novels
Films based on works by Bernhard Kellermann
Films set in Turkey
Works about petroleum
1937 multilingual films
1930s German films